Midnight Shine is a Canadian roots-rock band from Northern Ontario and Manitoba, consisting of lead vocalist/guitarist Adrian Sutherland (Attawapiskat First Nation), bassist/vocalist Stan Louttit (Moose Factory First Nation), guitarist/vocalist Zach Tomatuk (Moose Factory First Nation) and drummer Charnelle Menow (Norway House Cree Nation). They have released three studio albums and three music videos and have been actively touring across Canada since 2016.

History 

In 2011, Adrian Sutherland was given the opportunity to open for the band Trooper at their performance in Timmins, Ontario. He recruited 3 other musicians from the James Bay area to create Midnight Shine.

The band mixes roots, classic, and modern rock, with elements of their Indigenous language, Mushkegowuk Cree. In 2017, original drummer George Gillies departed the band. A year later, they recruited Charnelle Menow from Norway House, Manitoba as replacement.

In 2021 Sutherland released the solo album When the Magic Hits. The album was a Juno Award nominee for Contemporary Indigenous Artist of the Year at the Juno Awards of 2022.

Members 
 Adrian Sutherland – lead vocals, guitar (2011–present)
 Stan Louttit – bass, vocals (2011–present)
 Zach Tomatuk – guitar, vocals (2011–present)
 Charnelle Menow – drums (2018–present)
 George Gillies – drums (2011–2017)

Discography 
 Midnight Shine (2013; Midnight Shine Music)
 Northern Man (2014; Midnight Shine Music)
 High Road (2018; Midnight Shine Music)

Music videos 
"I Need Angels" (November 8, 2018)
"Heart of Gold" (January 8, 2019)
"Bobcaygeon" (January 14, 2019)
"Leather Skin" (May 27, 2019)

References 

Canadian rock music groups
First Nations musical groups
Musical groups from Ontario
Musical groups from Manitoba
Musical groups established in 2011
2011 establishments in Manitoba